Bisham  is a village and civil parish in the Royal Borough of Windsor and Maidenhead in Berkshire, England. At the 2011 Census, the population of the parish was 1,099, down from 1,149 at the 2001 Census. Bisham is home to one of Sport England's National Sports Centres.

Historic buildings

The National Sports Centre at Bisham is centred on Bisham Abbey, a 13th-century manor house, originally built for the Knights Templar but later the residence of the Montagu (or Montacute) Earls of Salisbury and the Hoby family.

Geography
Bisham has a local nature reserve on the eastern edge of the village, called Bisham Woods.

In popular culture
Bisham Church and churchyard, as well as the Compleat Angler Hotel, are featured in episodes of the 1990s BBC television detective series, Pie in the Sky. During the Nationwide Building Society's summer advertising campaign of 2010, when they were the official sponsors of the England football team at the World Cup, one of their television advertisements featured the England team playing on one of the pitches at Bisham Abbey. The parish church was clearly visible in the background. Theatrical couple Oscar Asche and Lily Brayton are buried in the graveyard of All Saints Church. A Ham class, minesweeper HMS Bisham, was named after the village.

External links

A short history of Bisham Church

References

 
Villages in Berkshire
Civil parishes in Berkshire
Royal Borough of Windsor and Maidenhead
Populated places on the River Thames